Being Human is a supernatural drama television series developed for North American television by Jeremy Carver and Anna Fricke, based upon the British series of the same name created by Toby Whithouse. The series premiered on Syfy and Space Channel on January 17, 2011, with a thirteen episode first season and tells the story of Aidan (Sam Witwer) and Josh (Sam Huntington), a vampire and a werewolf respectively, who move into a new apartment only to discover that it is haunted by the ghost of a previous tenant, Sally (Meaghan Rath). Together, the three of them discover that being human is not as easy as it seems. 

Season 3 began on January 14, 2013, and features several changes to the core dynamics of the group: Josh is no longer cursed to be a werewolf, Sally is brought back from the dead at the expense of killing her loved ones and slowly rotting away, and Aidan is threatened by a deadly virus that kills vampires. Amy Aquino joins the cast as the witch Donna who is responsible for bringing back Sally, but at a steep price, as does Xander Berkeley as Liam McLean, the father of the purebred twins from season 2 who is looking for his daughter after learning his son has been killed by a vampire.

Cast

Main cast
 Sam Witwer as Aidan Waite
 Meaghan Rath as Sally Malik
 Sam Huntington as Josh Levison
 Kristen Hager as Nora Sargeant

Recurring cast
 Bobby Campo as Max
 Connor Price as Kenny Fisher
 Pat Kiely as Nick Fenn
 Xander Berkeley as Liam McLean
 Deanna Russo as Kat
 Susanna Fournier as Zoe Gonzalez
 Lydia Doesburg as Erin Shephard
 Robert Naylor as Stevie Adkins
 Amy Aquino as Donna Gilchrist
 Mark Pellegrino as James Bishop
 Kyle Schmid as Henry Durham
 Alison Louder as Emily Levison
 Andreas Apergis as Ray
 Erica Deutshman as Beth
 Imogen Haworth as Holly
 Ellen David as Ilana Myers
 Angela Galuppo as Bridget
 Dawn Ford as Dutch Woman

Episodes

References

External links 
 
 

2013 American television seasons
2013 Canadian television seasons